The Dudley Moore Trio is a 1969 jazz album and the fifth LP recorded by the British jazz trio led by musician, composer, actor and comedian Dudley Moore. It was released in 1969 on Decca Records in the UK and Australia, and on London Records in the United States.

Personnel
 Dudley Moore - piano
 Jeff Clyne - bass
 Chris Karan - drums

Track listing
 "Fanfare"
 "120 plus optional magic exploding cadence"
 "Chimes"
 "Love song from an imaginary musical"
 "Bags of Chris"
 "Pop and circumstance"
 "Romantic notion"
 "Folk song"
 "Amalgam"
 "Nursery tune"
 "Hymn"

Release details
 Decca Records LK 4976 (UK), 1969 (mono)
 Decca Records SKLA 4976 (Australia), 1969

1968 albums
Decca Records albums
London Records albums
Dudley Moore albums